Dr. Lane Murray Unit is a women's prison of the Texas Department of Criminal Justice located in Gatesville, Texas. The prison is located on Texas State Highway 36, between Farm to Market Road 215 and Farm to Market Road 929. The  unit, which opened in November 1995, is located with the Christina Crain Unit, the Hilltop Unit, the Mountain View Unit, and the Woodman Unit. The unit is named after Lane Murray, who was the first superintendent of the Windham School District.

History
The State of Texas, in 1997, passed a law criminalizing any sexual relations between a prisoner and prison guard after, in the 1990s, prosecutors were unable to have a prison guard at Murray convicted for coercing inmates into sexual interactions. The prison guard stated that the sexual interactions were consensual.

In 2010 the Murray Unit began to host a faith-based dormitory rehabilitation program.

Notable prisoners

Current
Chante Jawan Mallard
Edith Beebe
Genene Jones

Former
Diane Zamora
Kimberly Saenz- (Intake) Moved to Mountain View Unit.
Karla Faye Tucker - American woman executed February 3, 1998, for killing two people with a pickaxe during a burglary. She was the first woman to be executed in the United States since Velma Barfield in 1984, and the first in Texas since Chipita Rodriguez in 1863.

References

External links

Murray Unit Texas Department of Criminal Justice

Prisons in Gatesville, Texas
Women's prisons in Texas
Buildings and structures in Coryell County, Texas
1995 establishments in Texas